Idea networking is a qualitative method of doing a cluster analysis of any collection of statements, developed by Mike Metcalfe at the University of South Australia. Networking lists of statements acts to reduce them into a handful of clusters or categories. The statements might be source from interviews, text, websites, focus groups, SWOT analysis or community consultation. Idea networking is inductive as it does not assume any prior classification system to cluster the statements. Rather keywords or issues in the statements are individually linked (paired). These links can then be entered into network software to be displayed as a network with clusters. When named, these clusters provide emergent categories, meta themes, frames or concepts which represent, structure or sense-make the collection of statements.

Method
An idea network can be constructed in the following way:
 60 to 200 statements are listed and assigned reference numbers. 
 A table is constructed showing which statements (by reference number) are linked (paired) and why. For example, statement 1 maybe linked to statements 4, 23, 45, 67, 89 and 107 because they all are about the weather (see table). 

The number of links per statement should be from 1 to 7; many more will result in a congested network diagram. This means choosing why the statements are linked may need grading as strong or weak, or by sub sets. For example, statements linked as being about weather conditions may be further subdivided into those about good weather, wet weather or bad weather, etc.). This linking is sometimes called 'coding' in thematic analysis which highlights that the statements can be linked for several and different reasons (source, context, time, etc.). There maybe many tens of reasons why statements are linked. The same statements may be linked for different reasons. The number of reasons should not be restricted to low number as so anticipate the resultant clustering. 
The reference numbers are put into a network diagramming software, usually in the form of a matrix with the reference numbers along the top and side of the matrix. Each cell will then have a 1 or 0 to indicate whether its row and column reference number are linked. 
The software is instructed to draw network diagram using maximum node repulsion. This encourages cluster formation.  Around 5 clusters are identified in the network diagram, both visually and using the cluster identification algorithms supplied with the software (e.g. Newnan Girvan sub-groups) 

A descriptive collective adjective name is determined for each cluster of statements (a meta narrative, classification name or label). 
The list of statements is then reported as being clustered into these five or so cluster names (themes, frames, concepts). For example, one might report that your analysis of the statements shows that those at community meeting were using the concepts of exposure, interaction, safety, light and inspiration in their responses.

Underlying philosophy 
In his book Notes on the Synthesis of Form, the pragmatist Christopher Alexander suggested networking the ideas of clients as means to identifying the major facets of an architectural design. This is still used modern design work usually using cluster analysis. Modern social network analysis software provides a useful tool for how these ideas can be networked. 
This simply adds ideas to the list of computers, power stations, people and events that can be networked (see Network theory). The links between ideas can be represented in a matrix or network. Modern network diagramming software, with node repulsion algorithms, allows useful visual representation of these networks revealing clusters of nodes.

When networking peoples' statements or ideas, these become the nodes and the links are provided by an analyst linking those statements thought to be similar. Keywords, synonyms, experience or context might be used to provide this linking. For example, the statements: (1) "That war is economics progressed by other means, might be considered linked to the statement"; (2) "That progress unfortunately needs the innovation which is a consequence of human conflict". 
 
Linguistic pragmatism argues we use our conceptions to interpret our perceptions (sensory inputs). These conceptions might be represented by words as conceptual ideas or concepts. For example, if we use the conceptual idea or concepts of justice to interpret the actions of people, we get a different interpretation (or meaning) compared to using the conceptual idea of personal power. Using the conceptual idea of justice makes certain action ideas seem reasonable. These may include due process, legal representation, hearing both sides, have norms or regulations for comparison. Therefore, there is a relationship between conceptual ideas and related apparently rational action ideas.

If the statements gathered at a consultative meeting are considered action ideas, then clusters of these similar actions ideas might be considered to examples of a meta idea or conceptual idea. These are also called themes, and frames. Modern research extending Miller's Magic number 7 plus or minus 2, to idea handling, suggests a five-part classification is appropriate for humans.

Notable applications and uses

Using networking to cluster statements is considered useful because:

It provides a multi-dimensional alternative to post-it notes in clusters.
It offers a convenient graphic which can be presented in reports and analysed using network metrics (See Computer assisted qualitative data analysis software). 
It is an auditable process where each step taken can be explained in supporting documentation.
It is a qualitative alternative, and thus more subtle and transparent, than NVivo, thematic analysis, cluster analysis, factor analysis, multidimensional scaling or principal component analysis. This subtleness includes enabling the analyst to deal with metaphor, synonyms, pronouns and alternative terminology generally. No variables (variation in numerical data) are necessary.

See also

 Brainstorming
 Concept driven strategy
 Concept mapping
 Group concept mapping – a very similar method of cluster analysis
 Institutional logic
 Pathfinder network
 Repertory grid
 Sensemaking
 Social network analysis
 Thematic analysis

References

Cognition
Linguistics
Qualitative research
Computer networking